Obed Raimundo Lopes Da Costa (born 15 October 1995), commonly known as Obetche or Obetchi, is a Bissau-Guinean footballer, who plays as a defender for the Guinea-Bissau national football team.

International career
Obetchi made his international debut for Guinea-Bissau on 20 June 2015, scoring in the 1-1 draw against Mali.

Career statistics

International

International goals
Scores and results list Guinea-Bissau's goal tally first.

References

External links 
 

Living people

1995 births

Association football defenders

Bissau-Guinean footballers
Guinea-Bissau international footballers